The England national under-21 football team, also known as England under-21s or England U21(s), is considered to be the feeder team for the England national football team.

This team is for England players aged under 21 at the start of the calendar year in which a two-year European Under-21 Football Championship campaign begins, so some players can remain with the squad until the age of 23. As long as they are eligible, players can play for England at any level, making it possible to play for the U21s, senior side, and again for the U21s, as Jack Butland, Harry Kane, Calum Chambers and John Stones have done. It is also possible to play for one country at youth level and another at senior level (providing the player has not played a senior competitive game in his previous country).

The U21 team came into existence in 1976, following the realignment of UEFA's youth competitions. A goalless draw in a friendly against Wales at Wolverhampton Wanderers' Molineux Stadium was England U21s' first result.

England U21s do not have a permanent home. They play in stadia across England, in an attempt to encourage younger fans in all areas of the country to attend matches. Because of the lower demand compared to the senior national team, smaller grounds can be used. The record attendance for an England U21 match was set on 24 March 2007, when England U21 played Italy U21 in front of a crowd of just under 60,000 at the new Wembley Stadium, also a world record attendance for a U21 game. The match was one of the required two events the stadium hosted in order to gain its safety certificate in time for its full-capacity opening for the 2007 FA Cup Final in May.

Coaching staff

Head coach

The original and most successful coach is Dave Sexton, who led the U21s from 1977 to 1990. In this period he combined his duties with managing the top-flight clubs Manchester United (1977–1981) and Coventry City (1981–1983). After Coventry he took a position within the FA as their first Technical Director, at Lilleshall. He handed over U21 responsibilities to England manager Graham Taylor's assistant Lawrie McMenemy for three years before resuming control from 1994 to 1996.

Peter Taylor took over in 1996 and, although never winning a tournament, his teams had an excellent record. He was controversially removed from the position in early 1999, however, and replaced initially by Peter Reid, who resigned after just one match in charge to dedicate more time to his other job as manager of Sunderland. Howard Wilkinson took over afterwards, yet could only produce four wins in ten competitive matches and quit after a year and a half in charge. David Platt took charge leaving his job at Nottingham Forest. Platt was U21 boss from 2001 to 2004, but had little success before Taylor's return. Taylor left in January 2007, as the senior national manager Steve McClaren wanted the U21s to have a full-time manager. Taylor, at the time, was combining his duties with his role as Crystal Palace boss.

On 1 February 2007, Manchester City manager Stuart Pearce was appointed as head coach on a part-time basis until after the European Championships in the summer of 2007. Nigel Pearson, Newcastle United's assistant manager, agreed to become Pearce's assistant. Their first match in charge was a 2–2 draw against Spain on 6 February 2007 at Derby County's Pride Park Stadium. For the match against Italy Nigel Pearson took charge as Stuart Pearce had club commitments. Steve Wigley assisted Pearson.

Pearce was dismissed as Manchester City manager on 14 May 2007, before the 2007 European Championships, but on 19 July 2007 he was named full-time U21s coach. He remained in the post until June 2013, when it was announced that his contract would not be renewed. On 31 July, the FA announced that England senior manager Roy Hodgson would take charge of an England U21 friendly match against Scotland at Bramall Lane, the match ended in a 6–0 win for Hodgson's side. Former England international Gareth Southgate was made manager of the under-21 team on 22 August.

In September 2016, Southgate was appointed to the temporary position of caretaker manager of the England senior side after the departure of Sam Allardyce. With Southgate overseeing the main team for four games, Aidy Boothroyd, the England under-20 manager, was appointed caretaker manager of the under-21s until Southgate's return. In February 2017, Boothroyd was confirmed as the permanent manager.
Boothroyd left the role on in April 2021 following a disappointing European Championship campaign. 

On 27 July 2021, Lee Carsley was promoted from his role with the England U20s to become the head coach of the U21s with Ashley Cole appointed as his assistant.

U21 coaching staff

Competitive record

As a European U21 team, England compete for the European Championship, with the finals every odd-numbered year, formerly even-numbered years. There is no Under-21 World Cup, although there is an U20 World Cup. For the first six (1978–1988) European Under-21 Football Championships, England did well, getting knocked out in the semi-finals on four occasions and winning the competition in 1982 and 1984. Then, as one might expect with a rapid turnover of players, followed a lean period.

After losing to France in the 1988 semi-final, England then failed to qualify for the last eight for five whole campaigns. In the qualifying stages for the 1998 tournament, England won their group, but fate was not on their side. Because there were nine groups, and only eight places, the two group-winning nations with worst records had to a play-off to eliminate one of them. England lost the away leg of this extra qualifying round and were eliminated on away goals to Greece. In effect, England finished ninth in the competition despite losing only one of their ten matches.

England qualified for the 2000 finals comfortably. Under the 1996-appointed Peter Taylor England won every match without conceding a goal. But with 3 matches to play, Taylor was replaced in a controversial manner by Howard Wilkinson, who won the next two matches. The three goals conceded in the 3–1 defeat to group runners-up Poland were the only blemish on the team's qualifying record. England got knocked out in the group stage of the European Championship finals in 2000 under Wilkinson.

After enlisting former international star David Platt as manager, England qualified for the 2002 tournament in Switzerland. Again England did poorly in the group stage. Platt's England failed to qualify for the 2004 tournament and he was replaced by the returning Peter Taylor. Taylor's England qualified from the group but lost to a strong France team in a two-legged playoff and failed to qualify for the 2006 tournament.

The next campaign started shortly after the 2006 finals – the qualification stage of the 2007 competition. UEFA decided to shift the tournament forward to avoid a clash with senior tournaments taking place in even-numbered years. The qualification stage was heavily reduced, being completed in a year's less time. In a 3-team qualification group, England qualified over Switzerland and Moldova, and then won a two-legged play-off with Germany to qualify for the finals to be held in the Netherlands. At the tournament, England progressed through to the semi-finals where they led for the majority of the match against the hosts. However, after a late equaliser and a marathon penalty shootout, England were eliminated.

In 2009, England finished as runners-up, losing 4–0 to Germany in the final.

England finished second in their qualifying group for the 2011 championships in Denmark. They subsequently defeated Romania in the play-offs to qualify for the finals tournament, where they were knocked out in the group stage after a 2–1 defeat to the Czech Republic. England also subsequently exited the 2013 and 2015 Finals tournaments at the group stage, reached the last 4 in 2017, before again exiting at the group stage in 2019 and 2021.

Note: The year of the tournament represents the year in which it ends.

*Draws include knockout matches decided on penalty kicks.

Media coverage 
England Euro qualifiers and friendlies are currently broadcast by Sky Sports.

Results and fixtures

2023

UEFA European Under-21 Football Championship

2023 UEFA European Under-21 Championship qualification

2023 UEFA European Under-21 Championship (Final tournament) group stage

Records

Most capped players

Note: Club(s) represents the permanent clubs during the player's time in the Under-21s. Those players in bold are still eligible to play for the team.

Leading goalscorers

Note: Club(s) represents the permanent clubs during the player's time in the Under-21s. Those players in bold are still eligible to play for the team.

Players

Current squad
The following players were named in the squad for games against France and Croatia, to be played 25 and 28 March 2023.

Caps and goals updated as of 27 September 2022 after the match against Germany. Names in italics denote players who have been capped for the senior team.

Recent call-ups
The following players have previously been called up to the England under-21 squad in the last 12 months and remain eligible for selection.

  Player withdrew from the squad before any games had been played.
  Player withdrew from the squad due to a call up to the senior team.

Past squads
2000 UEFA European Under-21 Football Championship squad
2002 UEFA European Under-21 Football Championship squad
2007 UEFA European Under-21 Football Championship squad
2009 UEFA European Under-21 Football Championship squad
2011 UEFA European Under-21 Football Championship squad
2013 UEFA European Under-21 Football Championship squad
2015 UEFA European Under-21 Football Championship squad
2017 UEFA European Under-21 Football Championship squad
2019 UEFA European Under-21 Football Championship squad
2021 UEFA European Under-21 Football Championship squad

References

External links
Official FA England Under-21 website Contains listings of current England U-21 players.
Uefa Under-21 website Contains full results archive
The Rec.Sport.Soccer Statistics Foundation Contains full record of U-21 Championship hosts and additional statistics, such as the Group Winners table for the 1998 qualifiers.

 
European national under-21 association football teams